Love Style is the debut mini-album by South Korean boy band  Boyfriend. The mini-album was released digitally on June 13, 2012. Followed by the release of the physical album on June 14, 2012.

Background and promotion 
On June 7, 2012, Starship Entertainment releases a floral themed comeback teaser image. The picture shows the members who are dressed with floral and pastel toned clothes to match up  with their cute and friendly image.

The following day, Boyfriend released the album jacket for their mini album "Love Style" through their official Twitter account. This time the image shows a look which was inspired by 'downster hipster' fashion of New York that is contrasting the floral themed image that they first unveiled. Starship Entertainment revealed, “This album will show a definite change along with a reflection of the current trends interpreted in Boyfriend’s own style. They’ll be trying some of the hottest looks for men this year like colored and patterned suits along with street fashion.”

It was also announced that members Jo Kwang Min and No Min Woo participated in writing their raps for the four tracks of the mini-album.

The teaser of their title track "Love Style" was released on June 11, 2012.

The group started promoting "Love Style" on Mnet's M! Countdown on June 13, 2012. It was also promoted on the shows Music Bank, Music Core and Inkigayo. The song "One Day (소나기)" was used for the comeback week special performances.

Track listing

Charts

Album chart

Sales

Digital chart

Music programs

Videography

Release history

References

External links 
 

2012 EPs
Boyfriend (band) EPs
Starship Entertainment EPs
Kakao M EPs